Benny L. Johnson (June 29, 1948 – August 10, 1988) was an American football defensive back who played five seasons in the National Football League (NFL) with the Houston Oilers and New Orleans Saints. He was drafted by the Houston Oilers in the sixth round of the 1970 NFL Draft. Johnson played college football at Johnson C. Smith University and attended Jones High School in Orlando, Florida. He was also a member of the Philadelphia Bell of the World Football League.

References

External links
Just Sports Stats
Fanbase profile

1948 births
1988 deaths
Players of American football from Georgia (U.S. state)
American football defensive backs
African-American players of American football
Johnson C. Smith Golden Bulls football players
Houston Oilers players
Philadelphia Bell players
New Orleans Saints players
People from Fort Valley, Georgia
Jones High School (Orlando, Florida) alumni
20th-century African-American sportspeople